Walter Bruno Gratzer (20 September 1932 – 20 October 2021) was a German-born British biophysical chemist. 

He was professor of biophysical chemistry at King's College London and an author and reviewer of popular science. He was the first Nature news correspondent appointed by editor John Maddox. Oliver Sacks of Nature writes that his reviews have high literary quality and show knowledge of a wide range of topics. He was a friend of James D. Watson, and wrote the introduction and afterword of his A Passion for DNA.

Gratzer received his BA in chemistry in 1954 and his MA in 1958 from the University of Oxford, and his PhD in 1960 from the National Institute for Medical Research. He was a research fellow at Harvard University from 1960 to 1963, a lecturer in biophysics at King's from 1963 to 1966, and worked at the Medical Research Council from 1966 to 1996. He died in London on 20 October 2021.

Publications

Books 
 The Longman Literary Companion to Science (1989) (editor)
 A Bedside Nature: Genius and Eccentricity in Science 1869–1953 (1996)
 The Undergrowth of Science: Delusion, Self-Deception and Human Frailty (2000) (Google Books)
 Eurekas and Euphorias: The Oxford Book of Scientific Anecdotes (2002) [2004] (Google Books)
 Terrors of the Table: The Curious History of Nutrition (2005) [2007] (Google Books)
 Giant Molecules: From Nylon to Nanotubes (2009) (Google Books)

Reviews 

 Review of A Short History of Cardiology by Peter Fleming, London Review of Books 19 (13): 24, 3 July 1997, accessed 7 November 2010. 
 "Per ardua ad: Stockholm", Nature 393: 640641, 18 June 1998, accessed 10 November 2010.  .
 "Now you see it, now you don't", Nature 408: 24–25, 2 November 2000, accessed 10 November 2010.  .
 "A stranger in a strange land", Nature 424: 725, 14 August 2003, accessed 10 November 2010.  .

Articles 

 
 Gratzer, Walter. "Obituary: Maurice Wilkins (1916–2004)", Nature 431: 922, 21 October 2004, accessed 7 November 2010. 
 Gratzer, Walter. "Nature — The Maddox Years", Nature, accessed 7 November 2010. .
 Gratzer, Walter. "Embryologist in Eden, a review of The Man Who Loved China: The Fantastic Story of the Eccentric Scientist Who Unlocked the Mysteries of the Middle Kingdom by Simon Winchester (2008), Harper Collins, New York ", The FASEB Journal 22 (10): 3415–3416, 1 October 2008, accessed 7 November 2010. Archived by WebCite on 7 November 2010. .
 Gratzer, Walter.  , ASBMB Today, December 2009, pp. 15–17, accessed 7 November 2010. Archived by WebCite on 7 November 2010. See HTML version here. Archived on 7 November 2010.

Academic papers 

 Pinder, JC et al. "Actomyosin motor in the merozoite of the malaria parasite, Plasmodium falciparum: implications for red cell invasion", Journal of Cell Science 111 (13): 1831–1839, 1998, accessed 10 November 2010.

References

Further reading 

 Ince, Martin. "No moos is good news", Times Higher Education, 1 March 1996, accessed 10 November 2010. Archived by WebCite on 10 November 2010.
 Mercer, Nick. "Serious Talk: Science and religion in dialogue", Third Way 19 (4): 27, May 1996.
 Barrow, John D. (1999) [2000]. Between Inner Space and Outer Space: Essays on Science, Art, and Philosophy, Oxford University Press, pp. 11–13. .
 Perspective: Walter Gratzer, Australian Broadcasting Corporation, 10 December 2002, accessed 10 November 2010. Archived by WebCite on 10 November 2010.
 Semenza, G.; Turner, A. J. (eds.) (2003). A History of Biochemistry: Selected Topics in the History of Biochemistry (volume 42), Elsevier. .
 Skern, Tim (2009). Writing Scientific English: A Workbook, UTB (publisher), p. 174. .
 "Eurekas and Euphorias: The Oxford Book of Scientific Anecdotes", Oxford University Press, accessed 7 November 2010. Archived by WebCite on 7 November 2010.

External links
 Webpage at King's College London
 Reviews at the London Review of Books

1932 births
2021 deaths
Academics of King's College London
Alumni of the University of Oxford
20th-century British biologists
21st-century British biologists
British chemists
British male journalists
British science writers